The Rt Rev William Richard Moore ( 1858–1930 ) was Bishop of Kilmore, Elphin and Ardagh  from  1915  to 1930.

Educated at Trinity College, Dublin, he was ordained in 1882  and his first post a curacy at Temple Michael. After this he was Vicar of Donnybrook and  Kiltoghert. He was Archdeacon of Ardagh from 1896 until his elevation to the episcopate as the 9th  bishop of the United Diocese. He was additionally Dean of Ardagh from 1920.

Notes

External links
 

1858 births
Alumni of Trinity College Dublin
19th-century Anglican bishops in Ireland
Bishops of Kilmore, Elphin and Ardagh
1930 deaths